Petey Dammit, often stylized as Petey Dammit!, is an American guitarist and bass guitarist. He is best known as a former member of the garage rock band Thee Oh Sees, with whom he recorded six studio albums. From 2014 to 2015 he performed with the post-punk band The Intelligence.

Other work
Dammit is the subject of the documentary film, Petey & Ginger - A Testament to the Awesomeness of Mankind, directed by Ada Bligaard Søby.

Discography
with Thee Oh Sees
Sucks Blood (2007)
The Master's Bedroom is Worth Spending a Night In (2008)
Help (2009)
Warm Slime (2010)
Carrion Crawler/The Dream (2011)
Floating Coffin (2013)

Other appearances
Vintage Future - The Intelligence (2015)

References

Alternative rock bass guitarists
Alternative rock guitarists
Year of birth missing (living people)
Living people
American rock bass guitarists
American rock guitarists
American male bass guitarists
Place of birth missing (living people)